Toyonaga (written 豊永) is a Japanese surname. Notable people with the surname include:

, Japanese actor, voice actor and singer
, Japanese shot putter

See also
Toyonaga Station, a railway station in Kōchi Prefecture, Japan

Japanese-language surnames